Mohammed Nasser Ahmed (born 1950) is a Yemeni major general, who was the defense minister of Yemen between 2006 and 2014.

Education
Ahmed was born on 1 January 1950 in Na`ab, Mudiyah District, Abyan Governorate. He holds a master's degree in military science.

Career
Ahmed served in various capacities in Yemeni army and ministry of defense until 1994. That year he became director of logistics and supply. He later joined the Congress Party. He was appointed defense minister by President Ali Abdullah Saleh in February 2006. He succeeded Abdullah Ali Alewa in the post.

Later Ahmed began to cooperate with future President Abed Rabbo Mansour Hadi. Ahmed retained his post in the government formed on 7 December 2012 after Saleh was removed from office. The so-called national reconciliation government was headed by prime minister Muhammad Salim Basindwah.

Assassination attempts
Ahmed survived an assassination attempt on 27 September 2011 in Aden. He escaped another assassination attempt unhurt in Sanaa on 11 September 2012. However, the attack killed at least 13 people. He escaped an ambush by al-Qaeda gunmen southeast of Sanaa on 9 May 2014.

References

1950 births
Living people
Yemeni generals
General People's Congress (Yemen) politicians
Survivors of terrorist attacks
People from Abyan Governorate
Defence ministers of Yemen
Mujawar Cabinet
Basindawa Cabinet